Mother and Child  is a 1934 German drama film directed by Hans Steinhoff and starring Henny Porten, Peter Voß, and Elisabeth Wendt. It is a sound remake of the 1924 silent film Mother and Child which had been a major hit for Porten. Franz Schroedter worked as art director on the film.

Cast

References

External links

Films of Nazi Germany
German drama films
German black-and-white films
1934 drama films
Films directed by Hans Steinhoff
Remakes of German films
Sound film remakes of silent films
1930s German films
1930s German-language films